The 8th Annual Grammy Awards were held March 15, 1966, at Chicago, Los Angeles, Nashville and New York. They recognized accomplishments of musicians for the year 1965. Roger Miller topped off the Grammys by winning 5 awards, whereas Herb Alpert and Frank Sinatra each won 4 awards.

Award winners
Record of the Year
Jerry Moss (producer) & Herb Alpert (producer and artist) for "A Taste of Honey" performed by Herb Alpert & the Tijuana Brass
Album of the Year
Sonny Burke (producer) & Frank Sinatra for September of My Years
Song of the Year
Johnny Mandel & Paul Francis Webster (songwriters) for "The Shadow of Your Smile" (Love Theme From The Sandpiper) performed by Tony Bennett
Best New Artist
Tom Jones

Children's
Best Recording for Children
Marvin Miller for Dr. Seuss Presents "Fox in Socks" and "Green Eggs and Ham"

Classical
Best Classical Performance - Orchestra
Leopold Stokowski (conductor) & the American Symphony Orchestra for Ives: Symphony No. 4
Best Classical Vocal Soloist Performance
Erich Leinsdorf (conductor), Leontyne Price & the Boston Symphony Orchestra for Strauss: Salome (Dance of the Seven Veils, Interlude, Final Scene)/The Egyptian Helen (Awakening Scene)
Best Opera Recording
Karl Böhm (conductor), Dietrich Fischer-Dieskau, Evelyn Lear, Fritz Wunderlich & the German Opera Orchestra & Chorus for Berg: Wozzeck
Best Classical Choral Performance (other than opera)
Robert Shaw (conductor), the Robert Shaw Chorale & the RCA Victor Symphony Orchestra for Stravinsky: Symphony of Psalms/Poulenc: Gloria
Best Classical Performance - Instrumental Soloist or Soloists (with orchestra)
Erich Leinsdorf (conductor), Arthur Rubinstein & the Boston Symphony Orchestra for Beethoven: Piano Concerto No. 4 in G
Best Classical Performance - Instrumental Soloist or Soloists (without orchestra)
Vladimir Horowitz for Horowitz at Carnegie Hall - An Historic Return
Best Classical Chamber Music Performance - Instrumental or Vocal
The Juilliard String Quartet for Bartók: The Six String Quartets
Best Composition by a Contemporary Classical Composer
Charles Ives (composer) for Ives: Symphony No. 4 conducted by Leopold Stokowski
Album of the Year - Classical
Thomas Frost (producer) & Vladimir Horowitz for Horowitz at Carnegie Hall - An Historic Return
Most Promising New Classical Recording Artist
Peter Serkin

Comedy
Best Comedy Performance
Bill Cosby for Why Is There Air?

Composing and arranging
Best Original Score Written for a Motion Picture or Television Show
Johnny Mandel (composer) for The Sandpiper performed by the Robert Armbruster Orchestra
Best Instrumental Arrangement
Herb Alpert (arranger) for "A Taste of Honey" performed by Herb Alpert & the Tijuana Brass
Best Arrangement Accompanying a Vocalist or Instrumentalist
Gordon Jenkins (arranger) for "It Was a Very Good Year" performed by Frank Sinatra

Country
Best Country & Western Vocal Performance - Female
Jody Miller for "Queen of the House"
Best Country and Western Vocal Performance, Male
Roger Miller for "King of the Road"
Best Country & Western Single
Roger Miller for "King of the Road"
Best Country & Western Album
Roger Miller for The Return of Roger Miller
Best New Country & Western Artist
The Statler Brothers

Folk
Best Folk Recording
Harry Belafonte & Miriam Makeba for An Evening with Belafonte/Makeba

Gospel
Best Gospel or Other Religious Recording (Musical)
Anita Kerr & George Beverly Shea for Southland Favorites

Jazz
Best Instrumental Jazz Performance - Small Group or Soloist With Small Group
Ramsey Lewis for "The "In" Crowd" performed by the Ramsey Lewis Trio
Best Instrumental Jazz Performance - Large Group or Soloist with Large Group
Duke Ellington for Ellington '66
Best Original Jazz Composition
Lalo Schifrin (composer) for Jazz Suite on the Mass Texts performed by Paul Horn

Musical show
Best Score from an Original Cast Show Album
Alan J. Lerner, Burton Lane (composers), & the original cast (Barbara Harris, John Cullum, Tito Vandis, Byron Webster & William Daniels) for On a Clear Day

Packaging and notes
Best Album Cover, Graphic Arts
George Estes (art director) & James Alexander (graphic artist) for Bartók: Concerto No. 2 for Violin/Stravinsky: Concerto for Violin performed by Joseph Silverstein & conducted by Erich Leinsdorf
Best Album Cover, Photography
Robert M. Jones (art director) & Ken Whitmore (photographer) for Jazz Suite on the Mass Texts performed by Paul Horn
Best Album Notes
Stan Cornyn (notes writer) for September of My Years performed by Frank Sinatra

Pop
Best Vocal Performance, Female
Barbra Streisand for My Name Is Barbra
Best Vocal Performance, Male
Frank Sinatra for "It Was a Very Good Year"
Best Performance by a Vocal Group
The Anita Kerr Singers for "We Dig Mancini"
Best Performance by a Chorus
Ward Swingle for Anyone for Mozart? performed by the Swingle Singers
Best Instrumental Performance
Herb Alpert for "A Taste of Honey" performed by Herb Alpert and the Tijuana Brass
Best Contemporary (R&R) Vocal Performance - Female
Petula Clark for "I Know a Place"
Best Contemporary (R&R) Vocal Performance - Male
Roger Miller for "King of the Road"
Best Contemporary (R&R) Performance - Group (Vocal or Instrumental)
The Statler Brothers for "Flowers on the Wall"
Best Contemporary (R&R) Single
Roger Miller for "King of the Road"

Production and engineering
Best Engineered Recording - Non-Classical
Larry Levine (engineer) for "A Taste of Honey" performed by Herb Alpert & the Tijuana Brass
Best Engineered Recording, Classical
Fred Plaut (engineer) & Vladimir Horowitz for Horowitz at Carnegie Hall - An Historic Return

R&B
Best Rhythm & Blues Recording
James Brown for "Papa's Got a Brand New Bag"

Spoken
Best Spoken Word or Drama Recording
Goddard Lieberson (producer) for John F. Kennedy - As We Remember Him

References

 008
1966 in California
1966 in Illinois
1966 in Tennessee
1966 music awards
20th century in Chicago
1966 in Los Angeles
20th century in Nashville, Tennessee
1966 in New York City
1966 in American music
March 1966 events in the United States